The Grover Cleveland Birthplace is a historic site located at 207 Bloomfield Avenue in Caldwell, Essex County, New Jersey, United States. It is the only house museum dedicated to U.S. President Grover Cleveland.

History
It was the home where Grover Cleveland was born in 1837. The building, also known as the Caldwell Presbyterian Church Manse, was built in 1832 and served as a Presbyterian church parsonage for the Cleveland family while Grover's father, Rev. Richard Falley Cleveland, served as a pastor of the local church. Cleveland was originally named Stephen Grover in honor of the first pastor of the First Presbyterian Church of Caldwell, but he did not use the name Stephen in his adult life. The family moved to Buffalo, New York in 1841. The Grover Cleveland Birthplace Memorial Association purchased the house in 1913 for use as a museum. In 1934, the state took over operation. It was documented by the Historic American Buildings Survey in 1936. The house was added to the National Register of Historic Places on November 16, 1977, for its significance in architecture, religion, and local history. It features vernacular architecture with touches of Federal styling

See also 

 National Register of Historic Places listings in Essex County, New Jersey
 List of museums in New Jersey
 Presidential memorials in the United States

References

External links
 
 
Official Grover Cleveland Birthplace Website
National Park Birthplace Website
New Jersey State Birthplace
"Life Portrait of Grover Cleveland", from C-SPAN's American Presidents: Life Portraits, broadcast from the Grover Cleveland Birthplace, August 13, 1999

Houses completed in 1832
Historic house museums in New Jersey
Houses on the National Register of Historic Places in New Jersey
Vernacular architecture in New Jersey
Presidential homes in the United States
Grover Cleveland
Museums in Essex County, New Jersey
Houses in Essex County, New Jersey
Biographical museums in New Jersey
Caldwell, New Jersey
National Register of Historic Places in Essex County, New Jersey
New Jersey Register of Historic Places
Historic American Buildings Survey in New Jersey
Birthplaces of individual people